Tokyo 8th district was a constituency of the House of Representatives in the Diet of Japan (national legislature). Between 1967 and 1993 it elected three, later two representatives by single non-transferable vote. It was created in a 1964 redistricting form areas that had previously formed part of the 1st district: It consisted of Eastern Tokyo's Chūō, Bunkyō and Taitō special wards, central parts of the former city of Tokyo. In a reapportionment for the 1993 election the number of representatives for Tokyo 8th district was reduced from three to two. Following the 1994 electoral reform, the area now forms the single-member Tokyo 2nd district.

Summary of results 
Tokyo 8th district usually went to the LDP with two to one seats while the opposition parties competed for the third seat. Exceptions were the elections of 1979 when the conservative vote was split between three LDP candidates (Takashi Fukaya, Nakasone faction, Kunio Hatoyama, Tanaka faction and Hisanari Yamada, without faction) and 1993 when Kunio Hatoyama had left the LDP to side with the opposition demanding political reform from the LDP. Hatoyama joined Takeo Nishioka's Kaikaku no Kai ("reform assembly") in 1994 that eventually became part of the Liberal Reform League (Jiyū Kaikaku Rengō) later that year.

Elected representatives

Last election result 1993

References 

Districts of the House of Representatives (Japan)
Politics of Tokyo